Al-Shifa may refer to:
The Book of Healing by Avicenna
Al-Shifa bi Ta'rif Huquq al-Mustafa by Qadi Iyad